Circles is the tenth studio album by American Christian metal band P.O.D. The album was released on November 16, 2018, via Mascot Records.

Background 
In August 2017, the group released "Soundboy Killa" as a promotional single from the album.  Later that year, the quartet travelled the United States and South America on the Soundboy Killaz with Powerflo, Alien Ant Farm and Fire from the Gods.

In September 2018, the ensemble released title track "Circles", followed by "Listening for the Silence", which peaked at No. 25 on the Billboard Mainstream Rock Songs chart.

The group worked on the record with Los Angeles production duo The Heavy, the most extensive collaboration the group has done.

The title of the album, possesses multiple meanings to lead vocalist Sonny Sandoval, who stated that "Part of the thought was, 'Man, is this new beginning for P.O.D., or is the beautiful end?'".

Sound and composition 
Blabbermouth.net stated that "The rap-driven "Rockin' With The Best" has an old-school P.O.D. sound that nods to the Beastie Boys, while "Always Southern California" is a reggae-inflected rocker and the groove-heavy "Soundboy Killa" is a hip-hop/metal hybrid", going on to say that "The dynamic title track even boasts moody electronic flourishes, glassy piano, and laid-back rapping verses".

Track listing

Charts

Credits 

P.O.D.
Sonny Sandoval  – vocals
Marcos Curiel  – lead guitar
Traa Daniels  – bass guitar
Wuv Bernardo  - drums, rhythm guitar

Production
 The Heavy (Jordan Miller and Jason Bell)  - production
 Cameron Webb  - production on "Listening for the Silence" & "Soundboy Killa"
 Jay Baumgardner  - mixing
 Howie Weinberg  - mastering
 Blake Lagrange  - engineering

References

Mascot Records albums
P.O.D. albums
2018 albums